The Sixth Element is a 2006 surfing film and documentary directed by Justin MacMillan about Ross Clarke-Jones. It is the only Ross Clarke-Jones video.

Cast
 Kelly Slater
 Jamie Brisick
 Matt Hoy
 Doug Silva
 Noah Johnson
 Gary "Kong" Elkerton
 Michelle LeRoy- The Sixth Element (a website dedicated to spiritual awakening following the teachings of Eckhart Tolle), It also explores the Indigo, Crystal, Rainbow and Star Children.

References
 yourmovies.com.au

External links
 
 The Sixth Element at MySpace

2006 direct-to-video films
2006 films
2006 drama films
2000s English-language films